King's American Dispensatory is a book first published in 1854 that covers the uses of herbs used in American medical practice, especially by those involved in eclectic medicine, which was the botanical school of medicine in the 19th to 20th centuries.  In 1880 John Uri Lloyd, an eclectic pharmacist of the late 19th and early 20th centuries, promised his friend, professor John King, to revise the pharmaceutical and chemical sections of the American Dispensatory. Eighteen years later an entirely rewritten eighteenth edition (third revision) was published in 1898. It was co-authored by eclectic physician Harvey Wickes Felter

External links
 Kings American Dispensatory, 1905 edition at the Internet Archive

1854 books
1898 books
Eclectic medicine
Health and wellness books
Herbalism
Pharmacology literature